L'Affaire Labricole was a 1981 French - Belgian thriller TV series aired in France, Belgium and Switzerland.

Cast
Gabriel Jabbour ....  Agénor Labricole
Fabien Kociszelski ....  Pierre Labricole
Maurice Aufair ....  Fiasco
Patrick Laval ....  Ambroise Lapin

External links

Affaire Labricole
1981 Belgian television series debuts
Affaire Labricole
Affaire Labricole
French-language television programming in Belgium